Ah, L'Amour (1995) is Don Hertzfeldt's first 16mm student animated short film, completed at the age of 18 at UC Santa Barbara. In 1998, the short won the Grand Prize Award for "World's Funniest Cartoon" from the HBO U.S. Comedy Arts Festival.

The cartoon is a satire of toxic men. In it, a pickup artist is violently torn apart by the women he targets, viewed only through his own one-sided, ridiculously misogynistic point of view. Hertzfeldt plays the part of a mentally unwell animator who's losing his grip on his sanity while animating, an idea he'd later revisit in other early "meta" shorts Genre and Rejected.

The soundtrack is acoustic guitar music, performed by Hertzfeldt on a boom box in his dorm room.

Release 

In the 1990s, the cartoon screened nationwide in theaters as part of the Spike and Mike's Festival of Animation tour.

In 2005, the original 16mm negative was digitally restored and remastered for release on the extensive "Bitter Films Volume 1" DVD compilation of Hertzfeldt's 1995-2005 films.  For the DVD, Hertzfeldt performed an alternate guitar soundtrack as a special feature, approximately 10 years after recording the original. Other special features for Ah L'Amour include Don's original production sketches and notes, as well as a very rare 1993 video short that Don created in high school that is a precursor to the film.

References

Short films directed by Don Hertzfeldt
American student films
American animated short films
Animated films without speech
1995 animated films
1995 films
1990s animated short films
1990s American animated films